Lasiopales is a genus of flies in the family Tachinidae.

Species
Lasiopales pachychaeta (Villeneuve, 1922)

Distribution
Turkmenistan, Uzbekistan, Algeria.

References

Diptera of Asia
Diptera of Africa
Exoristinae
Tachinidae genera
Taxa named by Joseph Villeneuve de Janti